= Samtenling Monastery =

Bhutanese Buddhist monastery

Religion
- Affiliation: Tibetan Buddhism

Location
- Location: Bhutan
- Country: Bhutan
- Interactive map of Samtenling Monastery

Samtenling Monastery is a Buddhist monastery in Bhutan.
